A sweater is a knitted or crocheted garment covering the upper part of the body.

Sweater or sweaters may also refer to:
 Sweater (EP), a 1998 EP by Eskimo Joe
 "Undone – The Sweater Song", a 1994 song by Weezer
 "Sweater", a 2020 single by Black Midi
 "Sweaters", a song by Laurie Anderson from her 1982 album Big Science (Laurie Anderson album)
 Sweater (film), a 2019 film directed by Shieladitya Moulik
 The Sweater, a 1980 short film adapted from Roch Carrier's short story "The Hockey Sweater"